Brundtland's Second Cabinet was a minority, Labour Government of Norway. It succeeded the Conservative Willoch's Second Cabinet, and sat between 9 May 1986 and 16 October 1989. It was replaced by the Conservative/Centre/Christian Democrat cabinet Syse after the 1989 election. The cabinet was historic in that 8 of the 18 members were female, to then the highest female share in a government ever in the world. Brundtland's cabinet had the following composition.

Cabinet members

|}

See also
 First cabinet Brundtland
 Third cabinet Brundtland
 Norwegian Council of State
 Government of Norway
 List of Norwegian governments

References

Notes

Brundtland 2
Brundtland 2
1986 establishments in Norway
1989 disestablishments in Norway
Cabinets established in 1986
Cabinets disestablished in 1989